Meteomedia may mean:
MétéoMédia, a Canadian French-language cable television channel specializing on weather
Meteomedia AG, a company providing weather data in Germany and Switzerland